Shark Bites and Dog Fights is the third studio album by Welsh band Skindred, released in September 2009.

Singles
"Electric Avenue", a cover of the song by Eddy Grant, was released as a single earlier in the year, and "Days Like These" was originally released on the Japanese edition of Roots Rock Riot. The first single, "Stand for Something", was released on 11 August 2009.

Background
On 15 September 2009, in an interview with Rock Sins, Benji stated that "One thing about this record and particular album, is that we had 3 weeks to actually record it before we set off on a US tour. The music was recorded and we all were happy with the way it sounded, but 60 percent of the lyrics and melodies were not in place or written so Matt LePlant [the producer] came out and set up his studio in the back of the tour bus. We worked on the songs together."

Track listing

Personnel
Skindred
Clive "Benji" Webbe – Vocals
Michael John "Mikeydemus" Fry – Guitar
Daniel Pugsley – Bass, Electronic
Arya "Dirty Arya" Goggin – Drums

Production
Produced by Matt LaPlant and Skindred
Engineered & mixed by Matt LaPlant and Mike Leslie
Mastered by Michael Fuller, at Fuller Sound, Miami, Florida
Additional composer: Eddy Grant on track 3
Management by Bieler Group, Inc.
Business management by Sharon Gilday and Dan Martin (Down To Earth)
A&R by Jason and Aaron Bieler
Artwork & design by Tim Fox
Art co-ordinator: Gerri Robinson

References

2009 albums
Skindred albums
Bieler Bros. Records albums